Panturichthys isognathus is an eel in the family Heterenchelyidae (mud eels). It was described by Max Poll in 1953. It is a tropical, marine eel which is known from the Gulf of Guinea in the eastern Atlantic Ocean, where it predominates south of the equator. It typically dwells at a depth range of 40–150 metres. Males can reach a maximum total length of 32.5 centimetres.

References

Heterenchelyidae
Taxa named by Max Poll
Fish described in 1953